The People’s Commissariat of Mortar Armament was one of the central offices in the Soviet Union, the equivalent of a Ministry, which oversaw the production of mortar weapons.

It was created on November 26, 1941 as the People's Commissariat of General Machine-Building Industry of the USSR (Наркомат общего машиностроения СССР). On February 17, 1946 it became the People's Commissariat of Machine Industry and Tooling of the USSR (Наркомат машиностроения и приборостроения СССР).

Headquarters
The headquarters were in the Chludov building in Moscow at Teatralniy Proezd (Театральный проезд). The phone book does not indicate the address of the Ministry.

List of ministers
Source:
 Pjotr Parshin (20.11.1941 - 17.2.1946)

References

Mortar
1941 establishments in the Soviet Union
1946 disestablishments in the Soviet Union